Taupo Borough Council v Birnie [1978] 2 NZLR 397 is a cited case in New Zealand regarding liability for loss of profits due to negligence.

Background
The Birnie's owned a motel in Taupo. As a result of repeated floodings at the motel, there was a substantial loss of income, which ultimately led to the motel later being sold at a mortgagee sale. 

The flooding was the result of works by the local council, which resulted in the culverts not being able to handle the water, causing the flooding at the motel.

Held
The Court awarded damages against the council.

References

Court of Appeal of New Zealand cases
New Zealand tort case law
1978 in New Zealand law
Taupō
1978 in case law